George Metcalf (1885–?) was an English footballer.

George Metcalf may also refer to:

 George E. Metcalf (1879–1956), British missionary
 George R. Metcalf (1914–2002), American publisher, news editor, author and politician
 George Metcalf Johnson (1885–1965), American writer who wrote under the name George Metcalf